The 2017 Louisiana–Lafayette Ragin' Cajuns baseball team represents the University of Louisiana at Lafayette in the 2017 NCAA Division I baseball season. The Ragin' Cajuns play their home games at M. L. Tigue Moore Field at Russo Park and were led by twenty-third year head coach Tony Robichaux.

Preseason

Sun Belt Conference Coaches Poll
The Sun Belt Conference Coaches Poll was released on February 8, 2017. Louisiana-Lafayette was picked to finish first in the West Division with 72 votes and 12 first-place votes; every first place vote available.

Preseason All-Sun Belt team
The Preseason All-Sun Belt Team was announced on February 2, 2017 and consisted of four Ragin' Cajun players.

Andrew Beckwith (CCU, SR, Pitcher)
Evan Challenger (GASO, R-SR, Pitcher)
Gunner Leger (ULL, JR, Pitcher)
Dylan Moore (ULL, JR, Pitcher)
Brady Cox (UTA, SR, Catcher)
Ryan Cleveland (GASO, SR, 1st Base)
Jonathan Ortega (TXST, SO, 2nd Base)
Drew LaBounty (USA, R-JR, Shortstop)
Seth Lancaster (CCU, JR, 3rd Base)
Dalton Thomas (LR, SR, Outfield)
Billy Cooke (CCU, JR, Outfield)
Travis Swaggerty (USA, SO, Outfield)
Steven Sensley (ULL, JR, Designated Hitter)
Joe Robbins (ULL, SR, Utility)

Roster

Coaching staff

Schedule and results
Louisiana–Lafayette announced its 2017 baseball schedule on October 31, 2016. The 2017 schedule consists of 27 home and 29 away games in the regular season. The Ragin' Cajuns will host Sun Belts foes Appalachian State, Arkansas State, Georgia Southern, South Alabama, and Texas State and will travel to Coastal Carolina, Little Rock, Louisiana–Monroe, Texas–Arlington, and Troy.

The 2017 Sun Belt Conference Championship will be contested May 24–28 in Statesboro, Georgia, and will be hosted by Georgia Southern.

 Rankings are based on the team's current  ranking in the Collegiate Baseball poll.

References

Louisiana-Lafayette
Louisiana Ragin' Cajuns baseball seasons
Louisiana-Lafayette baseball